Robert T. Price (June 7, 1903 – July 24, 1982) was an associate justice of the Kansas Supreme Court from November 30, 1948, to May 1, 1966, and chief justice from May 1, 1966, to September 1, 1971. He filled the position of Justice of the Supreme Court No. 7 as the republican nominatee. He succeed Jay S. Parker who stepped down after 23 years as chief justice in May 1966. When he retired Perry L. Owsley, a Democrat was appointed to fill the court position with Harold R. Fatzer appointed as the new chief justice.

Price was born in Shawnee County, Kansas and was graduated from the University of Kansas. He served in the navy in World War II, and spent 6 months as a prosecutor in the Japanese war trials.

Career
In 1948, Price ran for a seat on the Kansas Supreme Court. In August of that year Price pulled well ahead of three other candidates for the Republican primary nomination for the seat.

References

Justices of the Kansas Supreme Court
Chief Justices of the Kansas Supreme Court
1903 births
1982 deaths
University of Kansas alumni
People from Shawnee County, Kansas
20th-century American judges